Jacques Eugène Duclaux (14 May 1877 – 13 July 1978) was a French biologist and chemist.

1877 births
1978 deaths
École Normale Supérieure alumni
French centenarians
Men centenarians
Academic staff of the Collège de France
French biologists
20th-century French chemists
Members of the French Academy of Sciences